Dyesebel is a 2008 Philippine television drama romance fantasy series broadcast by GMA Network. The series is based on a Philippine graphic novel of the same title by Mars Ravelo. Directed by Joyce E. Bernal and Don Michael Perez, it stars Marian Rivera in the title role and Dingdong Dantes. It premiered on April 28, 2008 on the network's Telebabad line up replacing Kamandag. The series concluded on October 17, 2008 with a total of 125 episodes. It was replaced by Gagambino in its timeslot.

Premise
Dyesebel is a mermaid who will fall in love with Fredo. She must also stop the cruelties of her four adversaries: Ava, Berbola, Dyangga and Betty.

Cast and characters

Lead cast
 Marian Rivera as Dyesebel Montemayor-Legaspi / Isabel
 Dingdong Dantes as Fredo Legaspi

Supporting cast
 Michelle Madrigal as Berbola
 Alfred Vargas as Erebus
 Rufa Mae Quinto as Amafura
 Jean Garcia as Lucia Montemayor / Ava Legaspi
 Bianca King as Betty Salcedo
 Mylene Dizon as Dyangga 
 Ricky Davao as Juan Legaspi
 Lotlot de Leon as Banak
 Luis Alandy as Gildo Villarama
 Marco Alcaraz as Usaro
 Teri Onor as Akirang
 Paolo Ballesteros as Bukanding
 Aljur Abrenica as Paolo Legaspi
 Kris Bernal as Shiela Mae Legaspi / Shiela Mae Montemayor
 Hero Angeles as Mark
 Nanette Inventor as Guada
 Robert Villar as Buboy
 Chanda Romero as Felicia Montemayor

Guest cast
 Wendell Ramos as Florentino "Tino" Montemayor
 Vaness del Moral as Sosira
 Filiberto Nepomuceno as Butete
 Charlotte Hermoso as Jelay
 Ryan Yllana as Leo
 Philip Lazaro as Charity
 Mariz Ricketts as Melba
 Jackie Rice as Arana
 Fayatollah as Lady Dee
 KC Hollmann as Gildo's secretary
 Mang Enriquez as Mike
 Chinggoy Alonzo as Ernesto Montemayor
 Andrea del Rosario as Vivian Montemayor
 Kevin Santos as Fonsy
 Angel Estrada as Vicky
 Matt Ranillo III as Enrico Salcedo
 Jen Rosendahl as Vivian's friend
 Elizabeth Ramsey as Pearls' mother
 Joseph Marco as Joseph

Ratings
According to AGB Nielsen Philippines' Mega Manila household television ratings, the pilot episode of Dyesebel earned a 44.9% rating. While the final episode scored a 41.1% rating.

Accolades

References

External links
 

Dyesebel
2008 Philippine television series debuts
2008 Philippine television series endings
Fantaserye and telefantasya
Filipino-language television shows
GMA Network drama series
Mermaids in television
Philippine romance television series
Television shows based on comics
Television shows set in the Philippines